This article attempts to capture in one place the names of books and other works written in ancient India. For the purpose of this list, we consider all books written in India up to and including the Mughal era as being 'ancient books'.

Collections 

Each collection represents a set of books that are collectively known by the collection's name. In the list of books (shown below the table of collections), each book also refers to the collection it belongs to (if it does).

Books

Key 

 Subject Area - subject area of the book 
 Topic - topic (within the subject area)
 Collection - belongs to a collection listed in the table above
 Date - date (year range) book was written/composed
 Reign of - king/ruler in whose reign this book was written (occasionally a book could span reigns)
 Reign Age - extent of the reign
 Geographic Region - as it was known at the time of writing

See also 
 Indian literature
 Timeline of Hindu texts
 Sanskrit Buddhist literature
 Sanskrit literature
 Sanskrit revival
 List of Sanskrit universities in India
 List of Sanskrit academic institutes outside India
 List of Sanskrit poets
 Symbolic usage of Sanskrit
 Sanskrit Wikipedia

References

Indian literature-related lists
Ancient Indian literature
India history-related lists